Nyaung-u Sawrahan (also Taungthugyi Min c. 924–1001) was king of the Pagan dynasty of Burma (Myanmar) from c. 956 to 1001. Although he is remembered as the Cucumber King in the Burmese chronicles based on a legend, Sawrahan is the earliest king of Pagan whose existence has been verified by inscriptional evidence. According to scholarship, it was during Sawrahan reign that Pagan, then one of several competing city-states in Upper Burma, "grew in authority and grandeur". The creation of Burmese alphabet as well as the fortification of Pagan may have begun in his reign.

Chronicle tradition
Despite the historical importance, the king's reign is recorded in the chronicles with what has been identified as a legend by scholarship. According to the legend, Sawrahan usurped the throne from King Theinhko. Once a farmer, Nyaung-u killed Theinhko when he stole a cucumber from his field. Nyaung-u Sawrahan was accepted as king by the queen to prevent unrest in the kingdom and became known as Taungthugyi Min (Cucumber King or Farmer King). The story is likely a fairy tale. There are at least three other versions—an exact parallel in the Burmese fairy tale "Princess Thudhammasari" and two variants in Cambodian history, one in the eighth and another in the 14th century. Kings of Cambodia claim descent from the gardener.

Nyaung-u Sawrahan was overthrown by Kunhsaw Kyaunghpyu, who in turn was overthrown by Nyaung-u's sons Kyiso and Sokkate.

Dates
Various chronicles do not agree on the dates regarding his life and reign. The oldest chronicle Zatadawbon Yazawin is considered to be the most accurate for the Pagan period. The table below lists the dates given by four main chronicles, as well as Hmannan's dates when anchored by the Anawrahta's inscriptionally verified accession date of 1044.

Notes

References

Bibliography
 
 
 
 
 
 

Pagan dynasty
920s births
1001 deaths
10th-century Burmese monarchs
11th-century Burmese monarchs